Hampton L. Jarnagin was a lawyer, judge, and state legislator in Mississippi. He was born in Eastern Tennessee. Spencer Jarnagin was his brother.

He built Belle Oakes in 1844.

He spoke of the amnesty granted by U.S. president Andrew Johnson to Confederates. At Mississippi's 1865 Constitutional Convention he said Mississippi was abolitionized.

In 1872 he gave extensive testimony on conditions, events, and affairs he witnessed before and after the American Civil War at a congressional inquiry.

He represented Noxubee County in the Mississippi House of Representatives. He represented the 17th District in the Mississippi State Senate from 1880 to 1884.

Jarnagin died in 1887.

References

Members of the Mississippi House of Representatives
Mississippi state senators
Year of birth missing
1887 deaths
19th-century American politicians
People from Noxubee County, Mississippi